America's Party is the blanket branding for official New Year's Eve events held on the Las Vegas Strip, organized by the Las Vegas Convention and Visitors Authority and Las Vegas Events.

The event encompasses the ticketed "America's Party Downtown" concert held at the Fremont Street Experience, and a major public fireworks display—produced by Fireworks by Grucci—which is traditionally launched across the rooftops of various resort buildings on the Strip.

History 
In 2002–03 and 2003–04, Fox broadcast its New Year's Eve special from Las Vegas—America's Party: Live from Las Vegas—which was hosted from The Venetian by Ryan Seacrest of Fox's music competition series American Idol.

2005 celebrated the 100th anniversary of Las Vegas and began with a B-1 bomber flyover of the Strip. Fireworks were launched from the Excalibur, MGM Grand, Monte Carlo, Bally's, Flamingo, Venetian, Treasure Island, Stardust, Circus-Circus and Stratosphere.

America's Party 2007 was launched from 10 rooftops with coverage from CD USA and DirecTV.

America's Party 2008. The Best is Yet to Come, was launched from the MGM Grand, Planet Hollywood, Flamingo Las Vegas, Venetian, Treasure Island (TI), Circus-Circus and Stratosphere.

For America's Party 2009, the traditional rooftop fireworks display was replaced by a ground-based show due to additional fire department requirements that were put in place following the Monte Carlo Hotel fire.  The firework for the Takin' it to the Streets show, were launched from: Mandalay Bay Convention Center, Luxor Hotel, MGM Grand, Caesars Palace, Treasure Island, Las Vegas Convention Center and the Stratosphere Casino.

The fireworks return to the rooftops for the 2010 party, ''A Vegas Celebration", using the MGM Grand, Aria, Planet Hollywood Resort, Caesar's Palace, Venetian Resort, Treasure Island and the Stratosphere Tower.

The 2011 version launches an 8-minute 6 second show by Fireworks by Grucci from MGM Grand, Aria, Planet Hollywood, Caesar's Palace, The Venetian, Treasure Island and the Stratosphere Tower.  Grucci also provides a separate fireworks show for the Fremont street experience.

For 2012 the show was launched from the Tropicana, MGM Grand, Aria, Planet Hollywood, Caesars Palace, Treasure Island, The Venetian and the Stratosphere.  The show is being produced by Fireworks by Grucci.

Due to the COVID-19 pandemic in Nevada, both the fireworks show and America's Party Downtown festivities were cancelled for 2021. The Plaza still held its own fireworks show on the Strip.

Notes 

Las Vegas Strip
Tourist attractions in the Las Vegas Valley
Fireworks in the United States
New Year in the United States
Annual events in Nevada